Union, Common Sense and Progress was a political party in Canillo, Andorra. USiP contested the Andorran parliamentary election, 1992 on a joint list with Unity and Renewal. The list was the only one presented in the Canillo parochial constituency, and it won all four parliamentary seats (3 for Unity and Renewal, 1 for USiP).

References

Defunct political parties in Andorra